Navdeepn Singh (born 11 November 2000) is an Indian Paralympian and javelin thrower. He finished fourth in men's javelin throw F41 category at the 2020 Summer Paralympics.

Career 
In 2017, Navdeep secured gold for India in the men's javelin F41 event at Asian Youth Para Games in Dubai. He then won the gold medal at World Para Athletics Grand Prix 2021 (12th Fazza International Championships) in Dubai.

On 4 September 2021, Navdeep finished fourth in javelin throw F41 at 2020 Summer Paralympics.

See also 

 Athletics in India
 Indian at 2020 Summer Paralympics

References

External links 

 
 

2000 births
Living people
Paralympic athletes of India
Indian male javelin throwers
Athletes from Haryana
Place of birth missing (living people)
Track and field athletes with disabilities
Paralympic medalists in athletics (track and field)
Athletes (track and field) at the 2020 Summer Paralympics